Trouble Brewing may refer to:

 Trouble Brewing (1939 film), a 1939 British film
 Trouble Brewing (1924 film), a 1924 silent comedy film
 Trouble Brewing (brewery), an Irish craft brewery based in Allenwood, County Kildare